The Voice of Poland is a Polish reality talent show that premiered on September 3, 2011, on the TVP 2 television network. The Voice of Poland is part of the international syndication The Voice based on the reality singing competition launched in the Netherlands as The Voice of Holland, created by Dutch television producer John de Mol.

Selection process and format

The Blind Auditions

The blind auditions feature approximately 100 contestants who were selected during non-televised production pre-castings. At the beginning of the performance, the coaches have their backs turned to the participants, and if one of the coaches wants to take on a participant, he turns to face him and the singer is automatically placed on his team. If more than one coach is turned away, the singer chooses the coach they want to work with. In the first four editions and from the tenth, blind auditions end with the selection of 12 contestants. The size of the teams, however, varied over the editions: in the fifth and ninth, the teams had 13 members each, and in the sixth, seventh and eighth, 14.

From 11. edition during blind auditions, each coach can "block" another. The coach against whom the lockout was used loses the ability to invite that participant to his team. Each coach can use this feature at most twice. If a trainer uses a "block" against another judge and  he/she does not turn around - the "block" is considered unused; this means that the trainer in question can use it as long as he or she actually "blocks" someone.
"Block" buttons can be used both during and after a contestant's performance.

The Battles round

This is followed by battles in which the coaches choose two people from their team (when the number of participants in a team is odd, one of the battles is played by a trio, not a duo) who sing the same song together. The coach decides who moves on and who drops out of the program. In the first edition, coaches were assisted in their decision making by invited specialists. From the second edition onwards, the other coaches can make a "steal", i.e. take the loser to their team (by pressing their button). If more than one coach wants to steal a participant, that participant has the right to choose which team they want to go to. In the seventh edition, the "stealing" system has changed to what is known as the "hot chairs". Each coach can ultimately steal only one player (who sits on the hot seat assigned to that coach's team), because when "stealing" another player, the previously stolen person is replaced and dropped from the program; From this edition, each coach could steal (press the button and take over a player) up to three times, but from 10. The steal button coaches can press without limit. The battles therefore end with seven participants advancing to the next stage. During the ninth season, there was the first ever elimination of all participants from a team in one battle.

The Knockouts round

The battles are followed by a knockout (in the first edition: overtime), in which the coaches eliminate more people who don't make it to the live episodes. Up to and including the sixth edition, each of the coaches selected three people from his or her team (six people in the first edition, seven people in the second edition, eight people in editions three to five, and nine people in the sixth edition) who automatically qualified for the live episodes. He/She divided the others into threes (into two twos by the second edition), and one person from each would go on. Since the seventh edition, all contestants have to sing - the first four from each team are automatically put in the hot seats, and after subsequent performances of the remaining three, the coach decides whether a given contestant stays in the show or not. If a trainer leaves a contestant on stage in the show, they have to eliminate someone sitting in the hot seat. Four (five in the first, second and sixth editions) finalists from each team qualify for the live episodes.

The Live Shows

When the teams consist of 5, 4, or 3 contestants, the coach chooses from among the two contestants with the fewest votes from the viewers (who decide by sending text messages) the person who drops out of the program. Each such live episode ends with the elimination of one person from each group. In 11th season due to the coronavirus pandemic and recording episodes before they aired, the elimination rules were changed. Once all participants from a given team had sung their songs, the coaches scored the performances, awarding them from 1 to 10 points. The coach of that team would then select one participant to move on to the next section (regardless of scoring). The participant with the lowest number of points was eliminated from the remaining three or two (in case of a tie, the points from the coach of the evaluated team were decisive).

In the semi-finals (when the team is made up of two people), the coach distributes 100 points among his/her charges, and then everyone is credited with as many points as the percentage of votes he/she got from the spectators. In 5. edition, while the semi-final took the form of what is known in the international format as "Cross Battles", which involved players dueling between teams.
In the semi-final of the 11th edition the deciding factor was the total points awarded by all the coaches.

The Final

Four participants (one from each team, with the exception of 5. edition), and the winner is chosen by viewers in an SMS vote. Voting is divided into three rounds; after each round, the person with the fewest votes drops out. In the first round the finalists sing a foreign language song followed by a duet with their coach; in the second round the repertoire consists of Polish songs; in the third round the remaining two sing their own songs.

Coaches and hosts

Timeline of hosts

Timeline of backstage hosts

Key
 Main presenter
 Backstage presenter
 Contestant

Coaches and finalists 
 Winner
 Runner-up
 Third place
 Fourth place

Winners are in bold, other finalists in italic, eliminated artists in smaller font.

Series overview 
Warning: the following table presents a significant amount of different colors.

Season 1 (2011)

The judges for season 1 were Ania Dąbrowska, Adam "Nergal" Darski, Kayah and Andrzej Piaseczny. The show was hosted by Hubert Urbański, Magdalena Mielcarz and Mateusz Szymkowiak. The winner of the first series in 2011 was Damian Ukeje from Team Nergal.

Season 2 (2013)

The second season premiered on March 2, 2013. The judges were Justyna Steczkowska, Patrycja Markowska, Marek Piekarczyk and Tomson & Baron from Afromental. The show was hosted by Tomasz Kammel, Marika and Maciej Musiał. The winner of the second series was Natalia Sikora from Team Marek.

Season 3 (2013)

The third season premiered on September 7, 2013. The judges were Marek Piekarczyk, Tomson & Baron, Maria Sadowska and Edyta Górniak. Tomasz Kammel, Marika and Maciej Musiał returned. The winner of the third series was Mateusz Ziółko from Team Maria.

Season 4 (2014)

The fourth season premiered on March 1, 2014. The judges were Justyna Steczkowska, Tomson & Baron, Maria Sadowska and Marek Piekarczyk. All hosts from the previous season returned. The winner of the fourth series was Juan Carlos Cano from Team Maria.

Season 5 (2014)

The fifth season premiered on September 6, 2014. The judges were Justyna Steczkowska, Tomson & Baron, Edyta Górniak and Marek Piekarczyk. The show was hosted by Tomasz Kammel, Magdalena Mielcarz and Maciej Musiał. The winner of the fifth series was Aleksandra Nizio from Team Justyna.

Season 6 (2015)

The sixth season premiered on September 5, 2015. The judges were Edyta Górniak, Tomson & Baron, Maria Sadowska and Andrzej Piaseczny. The show was hosted by Tomasz Kammel, Halina Mlynkova and Maciej Musiał. The winner of the sixth series was Krzysztof Iwaneczko from Team Maria.

Season 7 (2016)

The seventh season premiered on September 3, 2016. The judges were Tomson & Baron, Maria Sadowska, Andrzej Piaseczny and Natalia Kukulska, who replaced Edyta Górniak. The show was hosted by Tomasz Kammel, Barbara Kurdej-Szatan and Maciej Musiał. The winner of the seventh series was Mateusz Grędziński from Team Andrzej.

Season 8 (2017)

The eighth season premiered on September 2, 2017. The judges were Tomson & Baron, Maria Sadowska, Andrzej Piaseczny and Michał Szpak, who replaced Natalia Kukulska. The show was hosted by Tomasz Kammel, Maciej Musiał and Barbara Kurdej-Szatan. The winner of the eight series was Marta Gałuszewska from Team Michał.

Season 9 (2018)

The ninth season premiered on September 1, 2018. Michał Szpak became the coach again. Tomson & Baron, Maria Sadowska and Andrzej Piaseczny resigned from the function of trainers, and their place was taken by: Patrycja Markowska returning to the program, who previously acted as a coach in the second edition of the program, and debuting in this role Grzegorz Hyży and Piotr Cugowski. The show was hosted by Tomasz Kammel, Barbara Kurdej-Szatan and Maciej Musiał.The winner of the ninth series was Marcin Sójka from Team Patrycja.

Season 10 (2019)

The tenth season premiered on September 7, 2019. Michał Szpak became a coach again. Patrycja Markowska, Piotr Cugowski and Grzegorz Hyży are replaced by Kamil Bednarek, Margaret and Tomson & Baron returning after a one-season break. The show was hosted by Tomasz Kammel, Marcelina Zawadzka and Maciej Musiał. Barbara Kurdej-Szatan resigned from the function of presenter. The winner of the tenth series was Alicja Szemplińska from Team Tomson & Baron.

Season 11 (2020)

The eleventh season premiered on September 12, 2020. Michał Szpak and Tomson & Baron became the coaches again. Margaret and Kamil Bednarek were replaced by Edyta Górniak, returning after a five-year break and a new coach Urszula Dudziak. The show was hosted by Tomasz Kammel, Maciej Musiał and Małgorzata Tomaszewska. Marcelina Zawadzka resigned from the function of presenter. The winner of the eleventh series was Krystian Ochman from Team Michał.

Season 12 (2021)

The twelfth season premiered on September 11, 2021. Tomson & Baron became the coaches again. Michał Szpak, Urszula Dudziak and Edyta Górniak were replaced by Justyna Steczkowska and Marek Piekarczyk, both returning after seven-year break and a new coach Sylwia Grzeszczak. The show was hosted by Tomasz Kammel, Małgorzata Tomaszewska, Aleksander Sikora and Michał Szczygieł. Maciej Musiał  and Adam Zdrójkowski resigned from the function of the hosts. The winner of the twelfth series was Marta Burdynowicz from Team Justyna.

Season 13 (2022) 

The thirteenth season premiered on September 3, 2022. On June 19, 2022, Justyna Steczkowska confirmed that she would return as a coach in the thirteenth season. On August 7, 2022, it was announced that Tomson & Baron, Marek Piekarczyk and a new coach Lanberry would join Justyna Steczkowska as coaches this season. The thirteenth season of the show is hosted by Tomasz Kammel, Małgorzata Tomaszewska and Aleksander Sikora. The winner of the thirteenth series was Dominik Dudek from Team Tomson & Baron.

References

External links
Official website

 
Telewizja Polska original programming
2011 Polish television series debuts
2010s Polish television series
2020s Polish television series